is a Japanese footballer currently playing as a midfielder for Roasso Kumamoto.

Career statistics

Club
.

Notes

References

1999 births
Living people
People from Niigata (city)
Association football people from Niigata Prefecture
Shizuoka Sangyo University alumni
Japanese footballers
Association football midfielders
J2 League players
Roasso Kumamoto players